The Gardiner Cup was a professional ice hockey tournament that was held in Edinburgh, Scotland from September 24, 2009 until September 27, 2009. It featured two professional hockey teams from the American Hockey League and two from the Elite Ice Hockey League. The Hamilton Bulldogs were the winner in the event, defeating the Toronto Marlies in the final 3–1.

History
The tournament was part of Scotland's 2009 Homecoming celebrations and was intended to honour the contribution of persons of Scottish descent to ice hockey. The tournament was named after Charlie Gardiner, professional goaltender with the Chicago Black Hawks. Gardiner was born in Edinburgh and was captain of the 1934 Black Hawks Stanley Cup championship squad.

Team Results
 Belfast Giants 0 wins, 1 loss, 0 goal scored, 7 goals against
 Edinburgh Capitals 0 wins, 1 loss, 1 goal scored, 6 goals against
 Hamilton Bulldogs 3 wins, 0 losses, 11 goals scored, 1 goals against
 Toronto Marlies 1 win, 2 losses, 7 goals scored, 5 goals against

The 2009 Gardiner Cup was awarded to the Hamilton bulldogs.

Schedule
All games were to be played at Murrayfield Ice Rink.

 September 24 - Hamilton versus Toronto, (Final) Hamilton wins 1-0 over Toronto.
 September 26 - (Semi-final) Edinburgh versus Toronto,  Toronto wins 6-1 over Edinburgh.
 September 26 - (Semi-final) Belfast versus Hamilton, Hamilton wins 7-0 over Belfast.
 September 27 - (Final) Winner of Edinburgh v. Toronto (Toronto) versus winner of Belfast v. Hamilton (Hamilton) Hamilton wins 3-1 over Toronto.

References
 
Notes

External links
  Official website

2009–10 AHL season
2009–10 in British ice hockey
2009 in Scottish sport
International ice hockey competitions hosted by the United Kingdom